Hemish Shah (7 April 1968 – 5 September 2001) was an English stockbroker before he became a professional poker player, and the winner of Late Night Poker series 4, where he beat the season 2 champion Simon "Aces" Trumper in the final heads-up confrontation.

During the tapings of Late Night Poker series 5 (won by Padraig Parkinson) players would look up and say "Thanks, Hemish" when they hit a lucky draw. The final for the season was the same day as Hemish's funeral and the players all insisted on attending it. (The production company flew them to London by helicopter.) In all, over 75 poker players attended his funeral.

WSOP 
He won a World Series of Poker bracelet and $312,340 in 2001 for winning the $5,000 Limit Texas Hold-em event. During the event he had to leave the table as he was suffering from stomach cramps. He went to hospital upon returning to England, but suffered a cardiac arrest at 03:00 GMT on 5 September 2001 and died, aged just 33. He was in good health (he didn't smoke, drink alcohol or eat meat) and his death shocked the poker world.

References 

 Article from The Guardian by Victoria Coren

External links 
 Tribute by Mark Napolitano
 Another Tribute by Mike Sexton
 Poker Participations on RankingHero

1968 births
2001 deaths
Poker players from London
World Series of Poker bracelet winners
English stockbrokers
English Hindus
20th-century English businesspeople